In filmmaking, a beat is a small amount of action resulting in a pause in dialogue. Beats usually involve physical gestures like a character walking to a window or removing their glasses and rubbing their eyes. Short passages of internal monologue can also be considered a sort of internal beat. Beats are also known as "stage business".

The word "beat" is industry slang that was derived from a famous Russian writer who told someone that writing the script was just a matter of putting all the bits together. In his heavy accent he pronounced bits as "beats".

A beat sheet is a document with all the events in a movie script to guide the writing of that script.

Beats as pacing elements
Beats are specific, measured, and spaced to create a pace that moves the progress of the story forward. Audiences feel uneven or erratic beats. Uneven beats are the most forgettable or sometimes tedious parts of a film. Erratic beats jolt the audience unnecessarily. Every cinematic genre has a beat that is specific to its development. Action film has significantly more beats (usually events); drama has fewer beats (usually protagonist decisions or discovery).  Between each beat a sequence occurs. This sequence is often a series of scenes that relates to the last beat and leads up to the next beat.

Following is a beat example from The Shawshank Redemption:

At 25 minutes: Andy talks to Red and asks for rock hammer. - Decision
At 30 minutes: Andy gets rock hammer. - Event
At 35 minutes: Andy risks his life to offer financial advice to Mr. Hadley. - Decision
At 40 minutes: Andy notes ease of carving his name in the wall. - Discovery

After each beat listed above, a significant series of results takes place in the form of the sequence, but what most people remember are the beats, the moment something takes place with the protagonist.

McKee
Stories are divided into Acts, Acts into Sequences, Sequences into Scenes, and Scenes into Beats. Robert McKee uses the word "beat" differently from that described above. He first defines a scene not as action occurring in one place but as action "that turns the value-charged condition of a character's life on at least one value with a degree of perceptible significance". He describes the Beat as "the smallest element of structure...(Not to be confused with...an indication...meaning 'short pause')".  He defines a Beat as:  "an exchange of behavior in action/reaction.  Beat by Beat these changing behaviors shape the turning of a scene."  Specifically, a scene will contain multiple beats, the clashes in the conflict, which build a scene to eventually turn the values of a character's life, called a "Story Event". He further describes beats as "distinctively different behaviors, . . . clear changes of action/reaction."

See also
 Unit of action, in acting

Notes

References

Further reading 
 
 
 
 

Cinematic techniques
Film and video terminology
Narratology